Frank Kitchen (birth registered third quarter of 1931) is an English World Cup winning former professional rugby league footballer who played in the 1950s.

Background
Frank Kitchen's birth was registered in Prescot district, Lancashire, England.

Playing career

International honours
Frank Kitchen won caps for Great Britain while at Leigh in the 1954 Rugby League World Cup against Australia, and New Zealand (World Cup 1954 2-caps, 3-tries).

Frank Kitchen played , i.e. number 5 and scored a try in Great Britain's 28–13 victory over Australia in the 1954 Rugby League World Cup first group match at Stade de Gerland, Lyon on Sunday, 31 October 1954, and scored two tries in Great Britain's 26–6 victory over New Zealand in the 1954 Rugby League World Cup third group match at Parc Lescure, Bordeaux on Thursday, 11 November 1954.

County Cup Final appearances
Frank Kitchen played , i.e. number 5, in Leigh's 22–5 victory over St. Helens 1952–53 Lancashire County Cup Final during the 1952–53 season at Station Road, Swinton on Saturday 29 November 1952.

Genealogical information
Frank Kitchen's marriage to Florence T. (née Riley) was registered during third quarter 1954 in St. Helens district. They had children; Raymond Kitchen first quarter  in St. Helens district), Susan Y. Kitchen second quarter  in St. Helens district),  and the twins; 
Michael Kitchen third quarter  in St. Helens district), and Stephen Kitchen third quarter  in St. Helens district.

References

External links
!Great Britain Statistics at englandrl.co.uk (statistics currently missing due to not having appeared for both Great Britain, and England)

1931 births
Living people
English rugby league players
Great Britain national rugby league team players
Leigh Leopards players
Rugby league players from Prescot
Rugby league wingers